Human Markup Language (also HumanML and, within the context of a HumanML document, huml) is an XML specification developed to contextually describe physical, kinesic, cultural, and social information about instances of human communication. Development by OASIS began in 2001, and HumanML committee members released a Human Markup Language Primary Base Specification 1.0 in late 2002.

Purpose
HumanML was proposed to "fundamentally enhance the human communications process, through the use of XML, with the purpose of ending human misunderstanding". It addresses this purpose by standardizing the presentation of details relevant to communicative acts. Such details may be social, contextual, gestural, or psychological, and may pertain to an individual in an act of communication or to the context of that communication. For example, just as Internet users may use emoticons ("smileys") to convey emotional information relevant to their essentially textual communication, HumanML codes the emotional importance and intent of a signal in a series of markup tags. The standard aims to provide an arbitrarily detailed way to represent information pertinent to any act of communication.

See also
 Emotion Markup Language

References

 Peltz, Jay. HumanML: The Vision. DM Direct, July 2005.
 Pena, Bill. HumanML: Emotional Metadata. ONLamp.com. O'Reilly: 8 September 2001.

Markup languages